The Union of South Africa competed at the 1928 Summer Olympics in Amsterdam, Netherlands. 24 competitors, 18 men and 6 women, took part in 25 events in 7 sports.

Medalists

Athletics

Boxing

Men's Flyweight (– 50.8 kg)
 Baddie Lebanon
 First round — Bye
 Second round — Defeated Olav Nielsen (NOR), points
 Quarterfinals — Defeated Ben Bril (HOL), points
 Semifinals — Lost to Armand Apell (FRA), points
 Third Place Match — Lost to Carlo Covagnioli (ITA), points

Cycling

One male cyclist represented South Africa in 1928.

Individual road race
 Fred Short

Rowing

Sailing

Swimming

Wrestling

References

External links
Official Olympic Reports
International Olympic Committee results database

Nations at the 1928 Summer Olympics
1928
1928 in South African sport